Ānaha Kēpa Te Rāhui (1822 – 30 September 1913) also known as Ānaha Mātao, was a notable Māori tribal leader, carver and assessor of New Zealand. In the 1860s, he led the Ngāti Tarāwhai iwi during the New Zealand Wars. He was born at Lake Okataina, New Zealand. As a carver, Te Rāhui is known for carving the meeting houses at Rangitihi and Tokopikowhakahau in 1878.

References

1822 births
1913 deaths
New Zealand Māori carvers
Ngāti Tarāwhai people
Te Arawa people